Michael O'Flaherty (1891 – 19 September 1952) was Mayor of Galway, Ireland from September 1950 to 19 September 1952.

Born in Galway in 1891 to a family from Carraroe, Connemara, his parents were Patrick Flaherty and Catherine Clancy. One of six children, among whom was Father Colman O'Flaherty who served as a chaplain in the American army during World War I and received the Distinguished Service Cross after his death serving the sick and dying. Another brother, Patrick, died during the Irish War of Independence. 

Upon graduating from St. Joseph's College he joined the editorial staff at the Connacht Tribune. He married Agnes Staunton of Kilcolgan in 1922 and had six children: Patrick (later a Mayor), Michael, Colm, Kathleen, Eva and Tina. He was a pioneer of the bus transport system in the west of Ireland, obtained contracts for mail routes prior to 1923, ran a cinema and O'Flaherty's Motors Limited. 

O'Flaherty was one of the longest-serving public representatives in the town, beginning in 1924 till his death on 19 September 1959. He was the last Chairman of the old Urban District Council and was a prime mover in the restoration of the Mayoralty in 1937. During his first term as Mayor, he awarded the Freedom of the City to Irish President Seán T. O'Kelly.

References
 Role of Honour:The Mayors of Galway City 1485-2001, William Henry, Galway 2001.

External links
 https://web.archive.org/web/20071119083053/http://www.galwaycity.ie/AllServices/YourCouncil/HistoryofTheCityCouncil/PreviousMayors/

1891 births
1952 deaths
Connacht Tribune people
Mayors of Galway
Politicians from County Galway